Starye Chelny may refer to:
Starye Chelny, Alkeyevsky District, Republic of Tatarstan, a village (selo) in Alkeyevsky District of the Republic of Tatarstan, Russia
Starye Chelny, Nurlatsky District, Republic of Tatarstan, a village (selo) in Nurlatsky District of the Republic of Tatarstan, Russia